NGC 2438 is a planetary nebula in the southern constellation of Puppis. Parallax measurements by Gaia put the central star at a distance of roughly 1,370 light years. It was discovered by William Herschel on March 19, 1786. NGC 2438 appears to lie within the cluster M46, but it is most likely unrelated since it does not share the cluster's radial velocity. The case is yet another example of a superposed pair, joining the famed case of NGC 2818.

The main nebula has a temperature of about 10–13,000 K, rising to 15–17,000 K at the inner edge.

The nebula consists of material ejected from the central star during the asymptotic giant branch stage, beginning some 8,500 years ago. The main nebula was formed at about half that age. It is one of the hottest stars known.

Gallery

References

External links

 NGC 2438 @ SEDS NGC objects pages

Planetary nebulae
Puppis
2438